The following is the order of battle of the Riverine Flotilla of the Polish Navy, an integral part of the Polish Navy in the period between the world wars.

Staff and the headquarters
Initially subordinate to the Referee of the Riverine Fleet in the Ministry of Military Affairs in Warsaw, in 1932 it was separated as a semi-independent branch of the navy based in Pińsk. In 1939 the commander of the Riverine Flotilla was Cmdr. Witold Zajączkowski and his chief of staff was Cmdr. Władysław Szczekowski. Other members of the staff were:

 Deputy commanding officer Cmdr. Henryk Eibel
 Artillery officer Cmdr. Włodzimierz Kleszczyński
 Technical officer Cmdr. Wacław Trzebiński
 Signals officer Cmdr. Bronisław Witkowski
 Intelligence officer Cmdr. Narcyz Małuszyński
 Head surgeon Cmdr. Władysław Kozłowski
 Chaplain Maj. rev. Henryk Antonowicz
 Flags officer Cmdr. Janusz Marciniewski

Riverine Flotilla

Staff vessels

 ORP Admirał Sierpinek command vessel (armed paddle steamer)
 S 1 liaison motorboat
 S 2 liaison motorboat
 Nr. 5 speed-boat

Combat groups

1st Combat Group 

 ORP Kraków river monitor (Capt. Jerzy Wojciechowski)
 ORP Wilno river monitor (Capt. Edmund Jodkowski)
 ORP Zuchwała gunboat
 ORP Zaradna gunboat
 KU 16 (KU being an acronym of Kuter Uzbrojony, that is armed cutter in Polish; similar in shape and armament to later PT boats and PBRs)
 KU 17 armed cutter
 KU 18 armed cutter
 KU 19 armed cutter
 KU 21 armed cutter
 K 20 barrack ship (krypa in Polish terminology)
 ORP Generał Sikorski anti-air defence armed paddle steamer (Capt. Władysław Fidosz - name uncertain)
 Nr. 1 speed-boat

2nd Combat Group
 ORP Warszawa river monitor (Capt. Jan May)
 ORP Horodyszcze river monitor (Capt. Andrzej Marzecki)
 KU 22 armed cutter
 KU 24 armed cutter
 KU 25 armed cutter
 KU 26 armed cutter
 K 8 barrack ship
 ORP Hetman Chodkiewicz anti-air defence armed paddle steamer (Capt. Edward Kulesza)
 Nr. 2 speed-boat

3rd Combat Group
 ORP Pińsk river monitor (Capt. Jan Kierkus)
 ORP Toruń river monitor (Capt. Bolesław Parydzaj)
 KU 7 armed cutter (reconnaissance)
 KU 23 armed cutter (service)
 KU 27 armed cutter
 KU 28 armed cutter
 KU 29 armed cutter
 K 10 barrack ship
 ORP Generał Szeptycki minelayer (armed paddle steamer)
 Nr. 3 speed-boat

Support units

Mine and gas warfare detachment 

 ORP Mątwa minelayer, capable of gas warfare and supporting a troop of engineers
 T 1, T 2 and T 3 T 5 class river minesweepers
 T 4, T 5, T 6 and T 7 T 1 class river minesweepers

Liaison unit
 KM 14 liaison cutter
 KM 15 liaison cutter
 K 2 floating signals base (radio station)
 P 3 motorboat
 Two platoons of signal troops and recce squads

Base
 KU 1 armed cutter
 KU 2 armed cutter
 KU 3 armed cutter
 ORP Neptun tugboat
 ORP Generał Sosnkowski hospital ship
 K 12 floating munitions depot
 K 13 floating munitions depot
 K 14 floating fuel depot
 K 15 floating fuel depot
 K 25 floating fuel depot
 K 17 canteen
 K 19 floating service and repair vessel
 K 7 frogmen support vessel
 K 9 floating barracks
 K 30 floating barracks

Riverine Air Escadrille
 K 4 barrack vessel
 P 4 motorboat
 Nr. 7 speed-boat
 Three R-17W seaplanes (mobilized separately)

Pińsk naval base
 ORP Kiliński tugboat
 P 1 motorboat
 P 2 motorboat
 Fifteen service vessels of various types
 AA platoon
 Signals platoon
 Administrative service platoon

War-time reorganization
On September 15, 1939, the Riverine Flotilla received orders from the commanding officer of the Independent Operational Group Polesie, Gen. Franciszek Kleeberg. Because of a possible breakthrough of the German forces in the northern sector of the front, the orders for the Flotilla were to prepare a defence of a 200 kilometres long front along the Prypeć river. The forces were to be divided into 8 semi-independent task forces, each defending a separate part of the river. However, a particularly dry and sunny summer resulted in shallow waters preventing many ships from reaching their area of operations. In addition, the Soviet invasion of September 17, 1939, made the plans obsolete.

Janów Group
 2 x armed cutters
 naval infantry platoon
 1 x Bofors 40 mm gun

Kaczanowicze Group
 ORP Kraków river monitor
 ORP Zuchwała gunboat
 2 x armed cutters

Group
 ORP Wilno monitor
 ORP Zawzięta gunboat
 ORP Zaradna gunboat
 2 x minesweepers
 rifle company

Lemieszewicze Group
 K 2 signals boat
 2 x liaison cutters (?)
 2 x liaison platoons

Mosty Wolańskie Group
 ORP Horodyszcze monitor
 ORP Warszawa monitor
 ORP Generał Sikorski AA ship
 ORP Hetman Chodkiewicz AA ship
 ORP Generał Sosnkowski hospital ship
 2 x armed cutters

Przewóz Łachewski Group
 ORP Pińsk monitor
 ORP Toruń monitor
 6 x armed cutters

Nyrcza Group
 ORP Mątwa
 2 x minesweepers

Sytnica Group
 ORP Admirał Siercinek HQ ship

See also
 Polish Defensive War
 Vessels of Polish Riverine Flotilla
 Riverine Flotilla of the Polish Navy

Polish Navy
Riverine Flotilla of the Polish Navy
Riverine warfare